William Franklin "Dixie" Gilmer (June 7, 1901 – June 9, 1954) was an American politician and a U.S. Representative from Oklahoma.

Biography
Born in Mount Airy, North Carolina, Gilmer was the son of W. F. and Emma Prather Gilmer. He moved with his parents to Oklahoma, and attended the public schools of Oklahoma City, Oklahoma. He served as a page in the House of Representatives from 1911 to 1919, and graduated from the law school of the  University of Oklahoma in Norman in 1923. Admitted to the bar in 1923, he commenced the practice of law in Wetumka, Oklahoma, and also served as a police judge and mayor.

Career
Gilmer served as member of the State house of representatives in 1927. In 1928, he married Ellen McClure of Celeste, Texas, and they had no children. He moved to Tulsa, Oklahoma, in 1929, and served as assistant county attorney of Tulsa County, Oklahoma from 1931 to 1933, as well as County attorney of Tulsa County 1936-1946.  He was an unsuccessful candidate for the Democratic nomination for governor in 1946.

Elected as a Democrat to the Eighty-first Congress, Gilmer served from January 3, 1949 to January 3, 1951. He was an unsuccessful candidate for reelection in 1950 to the Eighty-second Congress, and the governor appointed him state safety commissioner. He served in that capacity until his death.

Death
Gilmer died in Oklahoma City, Oklahoma, on June 9, 1954 (age 53 years, 2 days). He is interred at Memorial Park Cemetery in Oklahoma City.

References

External links
 

 Encyclopedia of Oklahoma History and Culture - Gilmer, William

1901 births
1954 deaths
Democratic Party members of the United States House of Representatives from Oklahoma
People from Mount Airy, North Carolina
People from Wetumka, Oklahoma
20th-century American politicians